HMS Glowworm was a G-class destroyer built for the Royal Navy in the mid-1930s. During the Spanish Civil War the ship spent part of 1936 and 1937 in Spanish waters, enforcing the arms blockade imposed by Britain and France on both sides of the conflict. Glowworm was transferred from the Mediterranean Fleet shortly after the beginning of World War II to the British Isles, to escort shipping in local waters. In March 1940, she was transferred to the Home Fleet, just in time to participate in the opening stages of the Norwegian Campaign. On 8 April 1940 Glowworm encountered German destroyers transporting troops to invade Norway in Operation Weserübung. The German destroyers attempted to disengage while calling for help from the heavy cruiser . In the chaos of battle, the heavily damaged Glowworm rammed Admiral Hipper, which broke off the destroyer's bow and she sank shortly afterwards. 
The commander of Glowworm was awarded the VC at the recommendation of the commander of Hipper. There were only two other occasions when a VC was awarded at the recommendation of the enemy in the Second World War.

Description
Steam for the turbines was provided by three Admiralty 3-drum water-tube boilers. The ship's complement was 137 officers and men in peacetime.

The ship mounted four 45-calibre 4.7-inch (120 mm) Mark IX guns in single mounts. For anti-aircraft defence Glowworm had two quadruple Mark I mounts for the 0.5 inch Vickers Mark III machine gun. She was the test ship for the new quintuple torpedo tube mounts for  torpedoes. One depth charge rail and two throwers were fitted; 20 depth charges were originally carried, but this increased to 35 shortly after the war began.

Operational history

Early career

Glowworm was ordered from the yards of John I. Thornycroft and Company, at Woolston, Hampshire on 5 March 1934 under the 1933 Construction Programme. She was laid down on 15 August 1934 and launched on 22 July 1935. She was completed on 22 January 1936 at a total cost of £248,785, excluding government-furnished equipment like the armament. Upon commissioning she was assigned to the 1st Destroyer Flotilla of the Mediterranean Fleet. Glowworm patrolled Spanish waters during the Spanish Civil War enforcing the edicts of the Non-Intervention Committee until she had a refit at Portsmouth between 27 May and 8 June 1937. The ship returned to the 1st Destroyer Flotilla in the Mediterranean after her brief refit. Glowworm returned to Portsmouth for a longer overhaul between 7 June and 25 July 1938 and escorted the ocean liner SS Strathnaver between Malta and Alexandria during the Munich Crisis in September 1938. She then escorted the light cruiser  on her voyage to Aden later that month. During night exercises on 16 May 1939, Glowworm collided with her sister, and was forced to put into Alexandria for temporary repairs. She received permanent repairs in Malta between 23 May and 24 June.

Glowworm was in Alexandria when World War II began in September 1939. They arrived at Plymouth on 22 October and were deployed in the South Western Approaches. Glowworm carried out convoy escort duties and anti-submarine patrols until 12 November when she was transferred to the 22nd Destroyer Flotilla, based at Harwich, for North Sea patrol and escort duties. On 22 February 1940 she was hit by the Swedish ship Rex in fog whilst at anchor off Outer Dowsing. Glowworm suffered significant structural damage and was under repair at a commercial dockyard in Hull until late March. On completion of the repairs, she was transferred back to the 1st Destroyer Flotilla of the Home Fleet, rejoining the flotilla at its base at Scapa Flow on 20 March.

The ships covered the minelaying operation in Norwegian waters, Operation Wilfred. On 7 April, Glowworm was detached from the task force to search for a man lost overboard.

Final battle

The destroyers were part of a German naval detachment, led by the heavy cruiser , on its way to land troops at Trondheim as part of the German invasion of Norway (Operation Weserübung). Glowworm opened fire and the German destroyers attempted to disengage, signalling for help. The request was soon answered by Admiral Hipper which spotted Glowworm at 09:50. Glowworm was hit by Hippers fourth salvo and she started making smoke. She turned into her own smoke in an attempt to break visual contact with Hipper, but the cruiser's radar-directed guns were not affected by the smoke. When the destroyer emerged from her smoke the range was now short enough that the cruiser's  guns could fire. Glowworms radio room, bridge, and forward 4.7-inch gun were all destroyed, and she received additional hits in the engine room, the captain's day cabin, and finally the mast. As this crashed down, it caused a short circuit of the wiring, causing the ship's siren to start a banshee wail.

The destroyer fell back through her smoke screen to buy time to get her second torpedo mount working, but Heye followed Glowworm through the smoke to finish her off before she could fire the rest of her torpedoes. The two ships were very close when Hipper emerged from the smoke and Roope ordered a hard turn to starboard to ram the cruiser. Hipper was slow to answer her helm and Glowworm struck the cruiser just abaft the anchor. The collision broke off Glowworms bow and the rest of the ship scraped along Hippers side, gouging open several holes in the latter's hull and destroying her forward starboard torpedo mounting. One German sailor was knocked overboard by the collision. Glowworm was on fire when she drifted clear and her boilers exploded at 10:24, taking 109 of her crew with her.

Admiral Hipper hove to in order to rescue her man overboard and Glowworms survivors. The German sailor was not found, but 40 British sailors were recovered, although at least six later died of their wounds. Lieutenant Ramsay, the senior surviving officer, told his rescuers that neither the helm nor the emergency steering was manned when the ships collided. German accounts only mention four torpedoes fired by Glowworm, but British accounts say all ten were fired. This was confirmed by photographic evidence taken after the collision showing all of her torpedo tubes empty.

Roope, who drowned when he could no longer hang on to a rope whilst being pulled up the side of the cruiser, was posthumously awarded the Victoria Cross, thus becoming the first VC recipient of the Second World War. The award was justified, in part, by the recommendation of Heye, who wrote to the British authorities via the Red Cross, giving a statement of the valiant courage Roope had shown when engaging a much superior ship in close battle. Ramsay was also awarded the DSO. Both awards were made after the end of the war.

Footnotes

References

External links
 Royal Navy History - HMS Glowworm 
 IWM Interview with survivor Albert Harris
 IWM Interview with survivor Fred Smith
 on naval-history.net 
Lt Cdr Roope's VC citation from the 

 

G and H-class destroyers of the Royal Navy
Ships built in Southampton
1935 ships
World War II destroyers of the United Kingdom
World War II shipwrecks in the Norwegian Sea
Maritime incidents in April 1940
Ships sunk in collisions
Ships built by John I. Thornycroft & Company